Albert Brojka (born 19 October 1958) was an Albanian politician and mayor of Tirana from 1996 through 2000. He was the Minister for Industry, Trade and Transport in the 1992 government of Sali Berisha. He is a member of the Democratic Party.

References

1958 births
Mayors of Tirana
Living people
Place of birth missing (living people)
20th-century Albanian politicians